Bud Tucker in Double Trouble is a 1996 point and click adventure game developed by Merit Studios (Europe) Limited and published by Funsoft.

References 

1996 video games
Adventure games
DOS games
DOS-only games
Video games developed in the United Kingdom
ScummVM-supported games